The Dark Ascent is the third novel in Walter H. Hunt's Dark series, published in 2004. It follows immediately after the events of The Dark Path. It follows Jackie Lappariere as she fights the Esqual and she finds the daughter of her Zor friend on a far off planet where her ship crashed. They discover that the Gyuyahar (the Zor sword of state) was used by villains and that Stone is Hesya, a Zor from thousands of years previous. However the story had been covered up by the first Zor high lord meaning that the legend they were following had a different outcome.

2004 novels
2004 science fiction novels